Agetinus is a genus of leaf beetles in the subfamily Eumolpinae. It is known from  Australia. The genus was originally named Agetus by Félicien Chapuis in 1874. However, the name Agetus was preoccupied by Agetus Kröyer, 1849 (in Crustacea), so the genus was renamed to Agetinus by Édouard Lefèvre in 1885.

Species
 Agetinus abjectus Lea, 1915
 Agetinus admirabilis Lea, 1915
 Agetinus aequalis Blackburn, 1889
 Agetinus australis (Boisduval, 1835)
 Agetinus cacozelus Lea, 1915
 Agetinus cicatricosus Lea, 1915
 Agetinus compositus Lea, 1915
 Agetinus confluens Lea, 1915
 Agetinus corinthius (Boisduval, 1835)
 Agetinus croesus Lea, 1915
 Agetinus hackeri Lea, 1915
 Agetinus juvencus Lea, 1915
 Agetinus nitidivirgatus Lea, 1915
 Agetinus obliquus Lea, 1915
 Agetinus subcostata (Chapuis, 1874)

References

External links
 Genus Agetinus Lefèvre, 1885 at Australian Faunal Directory

Eumolpinae
Chrysomelidae genera
Beetles of Australia
Taxa named by Édouard Lefèvre